The 2023 Chicago mayoral election was held on February 28, 2023, to elect the mayor of Chicago, Illinois. With no candidate receiving a majority of votes in the initial round of the election, a runoff election will be held on April 4, 2023. This two-round election takes place alongside other 2023 Chicago elections, including races for City Council, city clerk, city treasurer, and police district councils. The election is officially nonpartisan, with its winner being elected to a four-year term.

Incumbent Lori Lightfoot ran for a second term in office, but conceded after ongoing vote counts showed she would likely finish in third place. The  runoff will be between former CEO of Chicago Public Schools Paul Vallas and Cook County Commissioner Brandon Johnson.

Campaign 
Lightfoot's administration faced criticism due to rising crime rates in Chicago and accusations of covering up police misconduct. During her term, she clashed with members of the Chicago City Council, the Chicago Teachers Union, and Illinois governor J. B. Pritzker's administration. The New York Times remarked that she had an "uncanny ability to make political enemies." However, Lightfoot received praise for her efforts to build affordable housing, repair dilapidated areas of the city, and raise the minimum wage.

A wide field of nine challengers qualified for the ballot. Polling of the race was largely inconsistent but indicated that Lightfoot was in danger of losing re-election and that the candidates with the best chance of making a runoff were Lightfoot, U.S. Representative Chuy García, Cook County commissioner Brandon Johnson, former Chicago Public Schools CEO Paul Vallas, and businessman Willie Wilson. Polling also showed that Garcia enjoyed heavy support from Latino voters, while a plurality of white voters backed Vallas and a plurality of black voters backed Lightfoot. Vallas and Wilson were considered more moderate than Lightfoot, with García and Johnson being more progressive. However, many organizations in the coalition of labor unions and progressive groups that supported García in his 2015 campaign instead backed Johnson in 2023.

Lightfoot faced controversy when she emailed public school teachers offering school credit for students who interned on her campaign and when she told South Side residents to either vote for her or not vote at all, while Vallas faced accusations that he lived outside the city. Lightfoot ran ads tying García to Sam Bankman-Fried and Michael Madigan and criticizing Johnson's support for reducing police budgets. She and García also ran ads accusing Vallas of being an anti-abortion Democrat in name only. García also questioned whether Johnson could be objective as mayor given his close relationship with the Chicago Teachers Union, while Johnson in turn accused García of "abandoning the progressive movement" by adopting a more moderate policy platform in his 2023 campaign.

Several days before the election, Fran Spielman of the Chicago Sun-Times opined that polls demonstrated Paul Vallas to be the top front-runner, being likely to place either first or second in the initial round of voting and advance to a runoff, with Garcia, Johnson, and Lightfoot in contention for the second runoff spot.

Candidates

Candidates who advanced to the runoff

Candidates eliminated in the first round

Disqualified 
 Johnny Logalbo, freelance counselor (ran a write-in campaign)
 Frederick Collins, Chicago Police Department officer and candidate for mayor in 2015

Withdrew 
 John Catanzara, president of the Chicago Fraternal Order of Police (endorsed Vallas)
 Bradley Laborman, actor and realtor
Montelle Gaji
 Raymond Lopez, alderman from the 15th ward since 2015 (running for reelection, endorsed Wilson)

Declined 
The following speculated potential candidates did not run:

 Bill Conway, portfolio manager, former assistant Cook County state's attorney, and candidate for Cook County state's attorney in 2020 (running for city council)
 Stacy Davis Gates, president of the Chicago Teachers Union
 Arne Duncan, former U.S. secretary of education (2009–2016) and former chief executive officer of Chicago Public Schools (2001–2009)
 La Shawn Ford, Illinois state representative from the 8th district (2007–present) and candidate for mayor in 2019
 Janice Jackson, former chief executive officer of Chicago Public Schools
 Mike Quigley, U.S. representative from Illinois's 5th congressional district since 2009 (endorsed García)
 Pat Quinn, former governor of Illinois (2009–2015) (endorsed García)
Tom Tunney, alderman from the 44th Ward (2003–present) and vice-mayor (2019–present) (endorsed Vallas)
 Jesse Sharkey, former president of the Chicago Teachers Union
 Anna Valencia, Chicago City Clerk since 2017 and candidate for Illinois secretary of state in 2022 (running for reelection)

First round

Polling

Only showing polls by more-established polling sources: Bendixen & Amandi, GBAO, Impact Research, Lester & Associates, Mason–Dixon, Ogden & Fry, Public Policy Polling, and Victory Research

Note: FiveThirtyEight rates pollsters with letter grades ranging from A+ to F, with A+ being the highest rating and F being the lowest (see more)

Aggregates of polls

Endorsements

Results

The Chicago Board of Elections has claimed that early voting turnout in its 2023 municipal election is higher than early voting turnout in any previous Chicago municipal election. Vallas and Johnson advanced to the April runoff.

Runoff

Polling

Only showing polls by more-established polling sources: Lake Research Partners, Mason–Dixon, Victory Research

Note: FiveThirtyEight rates pollsters with letter grades ranging from A+ to F, with A+ being the highest rating and F being the lowest (see more)

Hypothetical runoff scenarios

Endorsements
Endorsements in bold were made after the first round.

Results

Notes

References

See also
Mayoral elections in Chicago

External links 
Official campaign websites
 Brandon Johnson (D) for Mayor
 Paul Vallas (D) for Mayor

Chicago mayoral
Chicago
Chicago mayoral election
2023